Boycott is a 1985 Iranian film directed by Mohsen Makhmalbaf, set in pre-revolutionary Iran. The film tells the story of a young man named Valeh (Majid Majidi) who is sentenced to death for his communist tendencies. It is widely believed that the film is based on Makhmalbaf's own experiences. Ardalan Shoja Kaveh starred in the film.

External links
 

1985 films
1980s Persian-language films
Films directed by Mohsen Makhmalbaf
1985 drama films
Iranian drama films